This is a list of islands of Fiji. Fiji is an archipelago in the Pacific Ocean.

It is split into 9 separate geographic island groups. The smallest is the Conway Reef Islands and Skerries, and the largest is the Vanua Levu Group.

Table of Islands

Conway Reef

Kadavu Group

Lau Islands

Lomaiviti Islands

Mamanuca Islands

Rotuma Group

Vanua Levu Group

Viti Levu Group

Yasawa Islands

See also 
 Geography of Fiji

Referenced 
2013-2014.Fiji Islands Visitor Guide. A copyright of Jasons Travel Media Ltd. 

 
Fiji
Islands